Katy Lennon (born 16 October 1984 in Carshalton) is a British artistic gymnast that represented Great Britain at the 2004 Summer Olympics. She was the team captain of the British team that finished eleventh. In the individual all-around, Lennon finished 21st with a score of 35.374. She now works as a coach for her old gymnastics club, Leatherhead and Dorking.

References 

1984 births
Living people
People from Carshalton
British female artistic gymnasts
Gymnasts at the 2004 Summer Olympics
Olympic gymnasts of Great Britain
Gymnasts at the 2002 Commonwealth Games
Commonwealth Games silver medallists for England
Commonwealth Games medallists in gymnastics
Medallists at the 2002 Commonwealth Games